Aickin is a surname, and may refer to:

 A pair of Irish actor brothers:
 Francis Aickin (died 1805)
 James Aickin (died 1803)
 George Aickin (1869–1937), Australian priest (born in England)
 Keith Aickin (1916–1982), Australian judge
 Rob Aickin, New Zealand record producer and musician